Udaas Naslain (translated into English as The Weary Generations) is an Urdu novel by Pakistani writer Abdullah Hussain. His debut novel, it led to his rise to prominence in Urdu literature. It won the Adamjee Literary Award in 1963, the year of its publication. It is considered as a masterpiece and one of the greatest novels in Urdu literature. It was translated into English and published in London in 1999.

The original edition of the book had a cover by Abdur Rahman Chughtai. The English edition was translated by Asghar Nadeem Syed.

The book is a work of episodic fiction and focuses on the roughly 35 years leading up to the Partition of India.

References

Urdu-language novels
1963 novels
Sang-e-Meel Publications books